Mikhail Potapov (born 1953) is a Russian mathematician, Professor, Dr.Sc., a professor at the Faculty of Computer Science at the Moscow State University.

He defended the thesis «Stable method for solving linear equations with noncompact operators and its applications to control and observation problems» for the degree of Doctor of Physical and Mathematical Sciences (2009).

Author of 15 books and more than 50 scientific articles.

References

Bibliography

External links
 Annals of the Moscow University
 MSU CMC
 Scientific works of Mikhail Potapov
 Scientific works of Mikhail Potapov

Russian computer scientists
Russian mathematicians
Living people
Academic staff of Moscow State University
1953 births
Moscow State University alumni